Watagan is a locality in the City of Cessnock, in the Hunter Region of New South Wales, Australia. It is located east of Laguna.

History 
Watagan was previously a part of the locality of Laguna, until 23 October 2015 when Watagan was separated from Laguna. The locality has been previously known as Watagan/Watagon/Wattagan/Wattagon Creek. A school existed at the locality in various guises from January 1862 until December 1944.

References 

Suburbs of City of Cessnock